Erik Norkroos (born 1 October 1969 in Tallinn)  is an Estonian cinematographer, producer, editor and director.

Between 1993 and 1997 studied cinematography (master Arvo Iho) at the Tallinn Pedagogical Institute nowadays known as Baltic Film and Media School, Tallinn University.

Producing documentaries at Rühm Pluss Null/Missing Pictures and Umberto Productions.

Filmography

Cinematographer 
 Randvere Leonardo (director Kerttu Soans), 2022
 Kasuemad / Foster Mothers (director Meelis Muhu), 2021
 Suurem kui sport / Bigger Than Sports (director Kerttu Soans), 2019
 Mees muinasjutust / A Man From A Fairytale (director Ruti Murusalu), 2019
 Risti aarded / Risti Treasures (director Ruti Murusalu), 2019
 Vello Salo. Igapäevaelu müstika / Vello Salo. Everyday mysticism (director Jaan Tootsen), 2018
 Ahto. Unistuste jaht / Ahto. Chasing a Dream (director Jaanis Valk), 2018
 Mõned tähelepanekud armastuse kohta / Some Notes About Love (director Maris Kerge), 2018
 Pagulasega elutoas / At Home With Refugees (director Kristina Norman), 2017
 Ühe unistuse maja / House Of A Dream (director Ruti Murusalu), 2016
 Hingemaa / Land Of Soul - Director's Cut (director Erik Norkroos, Kullar Viimne), 2016
 Täna mängime sõda / Today We Play War (director Meelis Muhu), 2016
 Hingemaa / Land Of Soul (director Erik Norkroos, Kullar Viimne), 2016
 Elizabeth'i mänguväljak / Elizabeth's Playground (director Maris Kerge, Erik Norkroos), 2015
 Englas. Vana soldat / Englas. Old Warrior (director Peeter Simm), 2015
 Puhta mõtte ruum / Space Of Pure Thought (director Puu Estonia), 2015
 Ballettmeister / Ballet Master (director Ruti Murusalu), 2014
 Musta mere pärlid / Pearls Of The Black Sea (director Erik Norkroos), 2014
 Ühisel pinnal / Common Ground (director Kristina Norman), 2013
 Üks palav suvepäev / One Hot Summer Day (director Erik Norkroos), 2013
 Velosoofid / Velosophy (director Jaan Tootsen), 2013
 Veregrupp / Blood Type (director Leeni Linna), 2013
 Sinine Kõrb / Ballerina Blues (director Ruti Murusalu), 2012
 Jahis ainult naised / Only For Women (director Kullar Viimne), 2012
 Sünnipäev / Birthday (director Erik Norkroos), 2011–2012
 Et meeldiks kõigile / A Monument To Please Everyone (director Kristina Norman), 2011
 Päikeselill / Flower Of the Sun (director Jaanis Valk), 2011
 Regilaul - laulud õhust / Regilaul - Lieder Aus Der Luft / Regilaul - Songs Of The Ancient Sea (director Ulrik Koch), 2011
 Roots - sada aastat sõda / Roots - One Hundred Years Of War And Music (director Katrin Laur), 2011
 Uus maailm / New World (director Jaan Tootsen), 2011
 Püha tuli / Holy Fire (director Erik Norkroos), 2010
 Kihnu pulm / Kihnu Wedding (director Meelis Muhu), 2009
 Kihnu kosjad / Kihnu Wooing (director Meelis Muhu), 2009
 Palusalu (director Kristina Davidjants), 2009
 Teisel pool teed / From Side To Side (director Jaanis Valk), 2009
 Ultra Vennikased / No Finish Line (director Kullar Viimne), 2009
 Aja meistrid / The Kings Of The Time (director Mait Laas), 2008
 Aljoša / Alyosha (director Meelis Muhu), 2008
 Professionaalne amatöör / Professional amateur (director Indrek Kangro), 2008
 24/1 ehk alla 7-aastastele keelatud (director Kerttu Soans-Tammisto), 2007
 Apteeker / Pharmacist (director Jaanis Valk), 2007
 Ihust ja hingest / From Body And Soul (director Indrek Kangro), 2007
 Öö / Night (director Jaanis Valk), 2007
 Pronksiöö: Vene mäss Tallinnas (director Urmas E. Liiv), 2007
 Hea uus ilm / Brave New World (director Jaan Tootsen), 2006
 Udmurtiast armastusega (director Õnne Luha), 2006
 Avasta rikas nurgatagune kosmoses (director Jaan Tootsen), 2005
 Kahe näoga saar (director Kerttu Soans-Tammisto), 2005
 Kursi koolkond (director Rein Maran), 2005
 Parma elu nimel / For Better Life (director Märt Sildvee), 2005
 Südame kutse: Inna Taarna (director Jaanis Valk), 2005
 Bussi juures (director Meelis Muhu), 2005
 ID (director Meeme Kerge), 2005
 Kinobuss - kino koju kätte (director Mikk Rand), 2004
 Osta elevant ära / Buy An Elephant, 2004
 Teistmoodi tihane / Another Titmouse (director Mart Taevere), 2004
 Meeleavaldaja / Opinionator (director Meelis Muhu), 2003
 Erki Kasemets (director Meelis Salujärv), 2002
 Isamaa ilu / Beauty Of Motherland (director Jaak Kilmi, Andres Maimik), 2001
 Kalamaja - puitlinna võimalus (director Marko Raat), 2001
 Päkapikudisko / Elf Disco (director Jaak Kilmi, Andres Maimik), 2001
 Inimeste lemmik / The Philosopher (director Meelis Piller), 2000
 Maire Männik, 54 rue du Montparnasse (director Rein Maran), 2000
 Suur õde / Big Sister (director Jaak Kilmi, Andres Maimik), 2000
 Töö / Work (director Rainer Sarnet), 2000
 Eesti posti lugu (director Aare Tilk), 1998
 Koera surm (director Urmas E.Liiv), 1998
 Õppija õigus (director Jaak Kilmi, Andres Maimik), 1998
 Inglid kaasa (director Märt Sildvee), 1997
 Ma armastan sind (director Peeter Herzog), 1996
 McCulloc (director Marko Raat), 1995
 Üksindus tema näo järgi (director Meelis Salujärv), 1995
 Vari seinal (director Rainer Sarnet), 1994
 Mielikuva / Mental Image (director Teppo Räisanen), 1994
 Merehaigus (director Rainer Sarnet), 1993
 Luuletus (director Meelis Salujärv), 1991
 Kell (director Erik Norkroos), 1988

Producer 
 Hobujõud / Horsepower (director Kullar Viimne), 2022
 Randvere Leonardo (director Kerttu Soans), 2022
 Pärand. Anu Raud / The Heritage (director Erle Veber), 2021
 Kasuemad / Foster Mothers (director Meelis Muhu), 2021
 Suurem kui sport / Bigger Than Sports (director Kerttu Soans), 2019
 Mees muinasjutust / A Man From A Fairytale (director Ruti Murusalu), 2019
 Risti aarded / Risti Treasures (director Ruti Murusalu), 2019
 Ahto. Unistuste jaht / Ahto. Chasing a Dream (director Jaanis Valk), 2018
 Jagatud valgus / Shards Of Light (director Kullar Viimne), 2018
 Pagulasega elutoas / At Home With Refugees (director Kristina Norman), 2017
 Ühe unistuse maja / House Of A Dream (director Ruti Murusalu), 2016
 Hingemaa / Land Of Soul - Director's Cut (director Erik Norkroos, Kullar Viimne), 2016
 Hingemaa / Land Of Soul (director Erik Norkroos, Kullar Viimne), 2016
 Elizabeth'i mänguväljak / Elizabeth's Playground (director Maris Kerge, Erik Norkroos), 2015
 Englas. Vana soldat / Englas. Old Warrior (director Peeter Simm), 2015
 Puhta mõtte ruum / Space Of Pure Thought (director Puu Estonia), 2015
 Ballettmeister / Ballet Master (director Ruti Murusalu), 2014
 Kuidas ma Aafrikat päästsin / How I Saved Africa (director Kullar Viimne), 2014
 Musta mere pärlid / Pearls Of The Black Sea (director Erik Norkroos), 2014
 Üks palav suvepäev / One Hot Summer Day (director Erik Norkroos), 2013
 Veregrupp / Blood Type (director Leeni Linna), 2013
 Sinine Kõrb / Ballerina Blues (director Ruti Murusalu), 2012
 Jahis ainult naised / Only For Women (director Kullar Viimne), 2012
 Sünnipäev / Birthday (director Erik Norkroos), 2011–2012
 Et meeldiks kõigile / A Monument To Please Everyone (director Kristina Norman), 2011
 Hing / Breath (director Kullar Viimne), 2011
 Päikeselill / Flower Of the Sun (director Jaanis Valk), 2011
 Regilaul - laulud õhust / Regilaul - Lieder Aus Der Luft / Regilaul - Songs Of The Ancient Sea (director Ulrik Koch), 2011
 Püha tuli / Holy Fire (director Erik Norkroos), 2010
 Kihnu pulm / Kihnu Wedding (director Meelis Muhu), 2009
 Kihnu kosjad / Kihnu Wooing (director Meelis Muhu), 2009
 Palusalu (director Kristina Davidjants), 2009
 Teisel pool teed / From Side To Side (director Jaanis Valk), 2009
 Ultra Vennikased / No Finish Line (director Kullar Viimne), 2009
 Professionaalne amatöör / Professional amateur (director Indrek Kangro), 2008
 24/1 ehk alla 7-aastastele keelatud (director Kerttu Soans-Tammisto), 2007
 Apteeker / Pharmacist (director Jaanis Valk), 2007
 Ihust ja hingest / From Body And Soul (director Indrek Kangro), 2007
 Öö / Night (director Jaanis Valk), 2007
 Hea uus ilm / Brave New World (director Jaan Tootsen), 2006
 Udmurtiast armastusega (director Õnne Luha), 2006
 Avasta rikas nurgatagune kosmoses (director Jaan Tootsen), 2005
 Kahe näoga saar (director Kerttu Soans-Tammisto), 2005
 Parma elu nimel / For Better Life (director Märt Sildvee), 2005
 Südame kutse: Inna Taarna (director Jaanis Valk), 2005
 Bussi juures (director Meelis Muhu), 2005
 ID (director Meeme Kerge), 2005
 Jumalaga / Godspeed (director Kullar Viimne), 2004
 Osta elevant ära / Buy An Elephant, 2004
 Teistmoodi tihane / Another Titmouse (director Mart Taevere), 2004
 Erki Kasemets (director Meelis Salujärv), 2002
 Ballada (director Märt Sildvee), 2001
 Raudroosiõied / Iron Rose Blossoms (director Karol Ansip), 2001
 Kalamaja - puitlinna võimalus (director Marko Raat), 2001
 Päkapikudisko / Elf Disco (director Jaak Kilmi, Andres Maimik), 2001
 Õine navigatsioon / Night Navigation (director Marko Raat), 1998
 Õppija õigus (director Jaak Kilmi, Andres Maimik), 1998
 Üksindus tema näo järgi (director Meelis Salujärv), 1995
 Luuletus (director Meelis Salujärv), 1991
 Kell (director Erik Norkroos), 1988

Director 
 Hingemaa / Land Of Soul - Director's Cut (co-director Kullar Viimne), 2016
 Hingemaa / Land Of Soul (co-director Kullar Viimne), 2016
 Elizabeth'i mänguväljak / Elizabeth's Playground (co-director Maris Kerge), 2015
 Musta mere pärlid / Pearls Of The Black Sea, 2014
 Üks palav suvepäev / One Hot Summer Day, 2013
 Sünnipäev / Birthday, 2011–2012
 Püha tuli / Holy Fire, 2010

Editor 
 Hobujõud / Horsepower (director Kullar Viimne), 2022
 Suurem kui sport / Bigger Than Sports (director Kerttu Soans), 2019
 Mees muinasjutust / A Man From A Fairytale (director Ruti Murusalu), 2019
 Risti aarded / Risti Treasures (director Ruti Murusalu), 2019
 Ahto. Unistuste jaht / Ahto. Chasing a Dream (director Jaanis Valk), 2018
 Jagatud valgus / Shards Of Light (director Kullar Viimne), 2018
 Pagulasega elutoas / At Home With Refugees (director Kristina Norman), 2017
 Ühe unistuse maja / House Of A Dream (director Ruti Murusalu), 2016
 Hingemaa / Land Of Soul - Director's Cut (co-director Kullar Viimne), 2016
 Hingemaa / Land Of Soul (co-director Kullar Viimne), 2016
 Elizabeth'i mänguväljak / Elizabeth's Playground (co-director Maris Kerge), 2015
 Englas. Vana soldat / Englas. Old Warrior (director Peeter Simm), 2015
 Musta mere pärlid / Pearls Of The Black Sea, 2014
 Üks palav suvepäev / One Hot Summer Day, 2013
 Sünnipäev / Birthday, 2011–2012
 Püha tuli / Holy Fire, 2010

References

1969 births
Living people
Estonian cinematographers
Estonian film directors
People from Tallinn
Tallinn University alumni